The Football Conference season of 1997–98 was the nineteenth season of the Football Conference, also known as the Vauxhall Conference for sponsorship reasons.

Changes since the previous season
 Hereford United (relegated from the Football League 1996–97)
 Cheltenham Town (promoted 1996–97)
 Leek Town (promoted 1996–97)
 Yeovil Town (promoted 1996–97)

Final  league table

Results

Top scorers in order of league goals

 Footballtransfers.co.uk contains information on many players on whom there is not yet an article in Wikipedia.

References

External links
 Official Football Conference Website
 1997–98 Conference National Results

1997-98
5